The Wensum Way is a 12-mile footpath route in Norfolk, UK, which opened in Spring 2013. It links the Nar Valley Way at Gressenhall Farm and Workhouse museum to the Marriott's Way at Lenwade.

The route takes its name from the River Wensum, in whose valley the route lies. The Norfolk County Council has hidden geocaches along the trail, which passes through 26 county wildlife areas and four Sites of Special Scientific Interest. The route forms part of the Norfolk Trails network.

See also
 Official Norfolk Trails website
 Recreational walks in Norfolk

References

Footpaths in Norfolk